Pseudogrammopsis lineata is a species of beetle in the family Cerambycidae, and the only species in the genus Pseudogrammopsis. It was described by Zajciw in 1960.

References

Agapanthiini
Beetles described in 1960
Monotypic beetle genera